Dehshir Rural District is in the Central District of Taft County, Yazd province, Iran. At the National Census of 2006, its population was 3,173 in 1,047 households. There were 2,567 inhabitants in 911 households at the following census of 2011. At the most recent census of 2016, the population of the rural district was 2,855 in 1,022 households. The largest of its 238 villages was Dehshir, with 1,320 people.

References 

Taft County

Rural Districts of Yazd Province

Populated places in Yazd Province

Populated places in Taft County